"If I Give You My Number" is the fourth single by PJ & Duncan, released as a single from their debut album, Psyche, on 26 September 1994.

Track listings
CDANT2

CDDEC2

Charts

References

1994 singles
1994 songs
Ant & Dec songs
Songs written by Deni Lew
Songs written by Nicky Graham